Events in the year 1976 in Cyprus.

Incumbents 

 President: Demetris Christofias
 President of the Parliament: Yiannakis Omirou

Events 
Ongoing – Cyprus dispute

 5 September – The Democratic Front won 21 of the 35 seats in the parliament following parliamentary elections. Voter turnout was 85.3%.

Deaths

References 

 
1970s in Cyprus
Years of the 21st century in Cyprus
Cyprus
Cyprus
Cyprus